|}

The Listowel Stakes is a Listed flat horse race in Ireland open to thoroughbreds aged three years or older. It is run at Listowel over a distance of 1 mile and 1 furlong (1,811 metres), and it is scheduled to take place each year in September.

The race was first run in 2011. Prior to 2015 it was run over 1 mile and 4 furlongs.

Records
Leading jockey (2 wins):
 Joseph O'Brien   – Chamonix (2012), Eye of The Storm (2013)
 Billy Lee – Devonshire (2015), Champagne Or Water (2016)
 Kevin Manning -  Riven Light (2017), Panstarr (2018) 

Leading trainer (3 wins):
 Aidan O'Brien – Chamonix (2012), Eye of The Storm (2013), Lancaster House (2019)

Winners

See also
 Horse racing in Ireland
 List of Irish flat horse races

References
Racing Post:
, 

Open middle distance horse races
Listowel Racecourse
Flat races in Ireland
Recurring sporting events established in 2011
2011 establishments in Ireland